The 1988 NCAA Division I women's volleyball tournament began with 32 teams and ended on December 17, 1988, when Texas defeated Hawaii 3 games to 0 in the NCAA championship match.

Texas won the school's first NCAA championship and became the first non-California or Hawaii university to win the NCAA national championship (Texas also won the last AIAW national championship). After upsetting previously unbeaten and top ranked UCLA in the national semifinals, Texas swept Hawaii in the final by the scores of 15-4, 16-14, 15-13, and became the first school to win every NCAA tournament match in sweeps (3-0), as they 15-0 in individual games.

Brackets

West regional

South regional

Mideast regional

Northwest regional

Final Four - Williams Arena, Minneapolis, Minnesota

See also
NCAA Women's Volleyball Championship

References

NCAA Women's Volleyball Championship
NCAA
Sports competitions in Minneapolis
1988 in sports in Minnesota
1988 in American women's sports
December 1988 sports events in the United States
1980s in Minneapolis
Volleyball in Minnesota
Women's sports in Minnesota